Gustavus Hamilton may refer to:

Gustavus Hamilton, 1st Viscount Boyne (1642–1723), Vice-Admiral of Ulster, Irish MP for Donegal County 1692–1713 and Strabane
Gustavus Hamilton (politician) (–1735), son of Gustavus Hamilton, 1st Viscount Boyne, Irish MP for Donegal County 1716–35
Gustavus Hamilton, 2nd Viscount Boyne (1710–46), Irish peer, English MP for Newtown (Isle of Wight)
Gustavus Hamilton (painter) (1739-75), Irish painter

See also
Gustav Hamilton (c. 1650–1691), Swedish born noble, Irish Governor of Enniskillen
Gustavus Hamilton-Russell, 10th Viscount Boyne (1931–95), Irish peer and Lord Lieutenant of Shropshire